The 1961 Syracuse Orangemen baseball team represented Syracuse University in the 1961 NCAA University Division baseball season. The Orangemen played their home games at Lew Carr Field. The team was coached by Ted Kleinhans in his 15th year as head coach at Syracuse.

The Orangemen won the District II Playoff to advance to the College World Series, where they were defeated by the Oklahoma State Cowboys.

Roster

Schedule

|-
! style="" | Regular Season
|-

|-
! bgcolor="#DDDDFF" width="3%" | #
! bgcolor="#DDDDFF" width="7%" | Date
! bgcolor="#DDDDFF" width="14%" | Opponent
! bgcolor="#DDDDFF" width="25%" | Site/Stadium
! bgcolor="#DDDDFF" width="5%" | Score
! bgcolor="#DDDDFF" width="5%" | Overall Record
|- align="center" bgcolor="#ccffcc"
| 1 || March 30 || at  || Unknown • Gettysburg, Pennsylvania || 11–3 || 1–0
|-

|-
! bgcolor="#DDDDFF" width="3%" | #
! bgcolor="#DDDDFF" width="7%" | Date
! bgcolor="#DDDDFF" width="14%" | Opponent
! bgcolor="#DDDDFF" width="25%" | Site/Stadium
! bgcolor="#DDDDFF" width="5%" | Score
! bgcolor="#DDDDFF" width="5%" | Overall Record
|- align="center" bgcolor="#ffcccc"
| 2 || April 1 || at  || Unknown • Annapolis, Maryland || 3–7 || 1–1
|- align="center" bgcolor="#ccffcc"
| 3 || April 3 || at  || Unknown • Baltimore, Maryland || 15–5 || 2–1
|- align="center" bgcolor="#ccffcc"
| 4 || April 4 || at  || Shipley Field • College Park, Maryland || 6–2 || 3–1
|- align="center" bgcolor="#ccffcc"
| 5 || April 28 || at  || Doubleday Field • West Point, New York || 7–2 || 4–1
|- align="center" bgcolor="#ffcccc"
| 6 || April 29 || at  || Fisher Field • Easton, Pennsylvania || 7–2 || 4–2

|-
! bgcolor="#DDDDFF" width="3%" | #
! bgcolor="#DDDDFF" width="7%" | Date
! bgcolor="#DDDDFF" width="14%" | Opponent
! bgcolor="#DDDDFF" width="25%" | Site/Stadium
! bgcolor="#DDDDFF" width="5%" | Score
! bgcolor="#DDDDFF" width="5%" | Overall Record
|- align="center" bgcolor="#ccffcc"
| 7 || May 2 ||  || Lew Carr Field • Syracuse, New York || 12–2 || 5–2
|- align="center" bgcolor="#ccffcc"
| 8 || May 4 ||  || Lew Carr Field • Syracuse, New York || 4–0 || 6–2
|- align="center" bgcolor="#ccffcc"
| 9 || May 5 ||  || Lew Carr Field • Syracuse, New York || 6–1 || 7–2
|- align="center" bgcolor="#ccffcc"
| 10 || May 6 ||  || Unknown • Unknown || 13–7 || 8–2
|- align="center" bgcolor="#ccffcc"
| 11 || May 8 || at  || Unknown • Potsdam, New York || 15–12 || 9–2
|- align="center" bgcolor="#ffcccc"
| 12 || May 9 || at  || Unknown • Canton, New York || 1–2 || 9–3
|- align="center" bgcolor="#ccffcc"
| 13 || May 12 ||  || Lew Carr Field • Syracuse, New York || 21–0 || 10–3
|- align="center" bgcolor="#ccffcc"
| 14 || May 13 ||  || Lew Carr Field • Syracuse, New York || 10–0 || 11–3
|- align="center" bgcolor="#ccffcc"
| 15 || May 13 || Penn State || Lew Carr Field • Syracuse, New York || 3–2 || 12–3
|- align="center" bgcolor="#ccffcc"
| 16 || May 17 || at Cornell || Hoy Field • Ithaca, New York || – || 13–3
|- align="center" bgcolor="#ccffcc"
| 17 || May 18 ||  || Lew Carr Field • Syracuse, New York || – || 14–3
|-

|-
! style="" | Postseason
|-

|-
! bgcolor="#DDDDFF" width="3%" | #
! bgcolor="#DDDDFF" width="7%" | Date
! bgcolor="#DDDDFF" width="14%" | Opponent
! bgcolor="#DDDDFF" width="25%" | Site/Stadium
! bgcolor="#DDDDFF" width="5%" | Score
! bgcolor="#DDDDFF" width="5%" | Overall Record
|- align="center" bgcolor="#ccffcc"
| 18 || vs June 3 ||  || Lew Carr Field • Syracuse, New York || 2–0 || 15–3
|- align="center" bgcolor="#ccffcc"
| 19 || vs June 7 ||  || Lew Carr Field • Syracuse, New York || 9–3 || 16–3
|-

|-
! bgcolor="#DDDDFF" width="3%" | #
! bgcolor="#DDDDFF" width="7%" | Date
! bgcolor="#DDDDFF" width="14%" | Opponent
! bgcolor="#DDDDFF" width="25%" | Site/Stadium
! bgcolor="#DDDDFF" width="5%" | Score
! bgcolor="#DDDDFF" width="5%" | Overall Record
|- align="center" bgcolor="#ccffcc"
| 20 || June 10 || vs Colorado State College || Omaha Municipal Stadium • Omaha, Nebraska || 12–5 || 17–3
|- align="center" bgcolor="#ffcccc"
| 21 || June 11 || vs Oklahoma State || Omaha Municipal Stadium • Omaha, Nebraska || 9–12 || 17–4
|- align="center" bgcolor="#ccffcc"
| 22 || June 12 || vs Western Michigan || Omaha Municipal Stadium • Omaha, Nebraska || 6–0 || 18–4
|- align="center" bgcolor="#ffcccc"
| 23 || June 13 || vs Oklahoma State || Omaha Municipal Stadium • Omaha, Nebraska || 0–8 || 18–5
|-

|-
|

Awards and honors
Dave Sarette
College World Series All-Tournament Team

References

Syracuse Orangemen baseball seasons
Syracuse Orangemen baseball
College World Series seasons
Syracuse